The 1884 Philadelphia Athletics finished with a 61–46 record and finished in seventh place in the American Association.

Regular season

Season standings

Record vs. opponents

Opening Day lineup

Notable transactions 
 August 1884: Frank Ringo was signed as a free agent by the Athletics.

Roster

Player stats

Batting

Starters by position 
Note: Pos = Position; G = Games played; AB = At bats; H = Hits; Avg. = Batting average; HR = Home runs

Other batters 
Note: G = Games played; AB = At bats; H = Hits; Avg. = Batting average; HR = Home runs

Pitching

Starting pitchers 
Note: G = Games pitched; IP = Innings pitched; W = Wins; L = Losses; ERA = Earned run average; SO = Strikeouts

Other pitchers 
Note: G = Games pitched; IP = Innings pitched; W = Wins; L = Losses; ERA = Earned run average; SO = Strikeouts

Relief pitchers 
Note: G = Games pitched; W = Wins; L = Losses; SV = Saves; ERA = Earned run average; SO = Strikeouts

Notes

References 
 1884 Philadelphia Athletics team page at Baseball Reference

Philadelphia Athletics (AA) seasons
Philadelphia Athletics season
Philadelphia Athletics